Văduva is a Romanian surname. Notable people with the surname include:

 Ilie Văduva (1934–1998), Romanian politician
 Leontina Vaduva (born 1960), Romanian opera singer
 Robert Văduva (born 1992), Romanian footballer

Romanian-language surnames